Family Gathering in the House of Prellstein (German: Familientag im Hause Prellstein) is a 1927 German silent comedy film directed by Hans Steinhoff and starring S. Z. Sakall, Erika Glässner and Sig Arno.

Cast
S. Z. Sakall as Sami Bambus 
Erika Glässner as Flora Bambus, geb. Bimbaum 
Sig Arno as Prellstein  
Paul Morgan as David Freundlich 
Anton Herrnfeld as Jaromir Schestak 
Karl Etlinger as Moritz Igel 
Fritz Spira as Salomon Stern 
Ilka Grüning as Seraphine 
Max Ehrlich as Ober im Café International

References

External links

Films of the Weimar Republic
1927 comedy films
German silent feature films
German comedy films
Films directed by Hans Steinhoff
UFA GmbH films
German black-and-white films
Silent comedy films
1920s German films
1920s German-language films